The New Zealand Exhibition held in Dunedin, New Zealand, in 1865 was a world's fair visited by 31250 people. 
It was the first world's fair held in New Zealand. 
It opened on 12 January and ran until 6 May 1865.

Organisation
Following the Bazaar and Industrial Exhibition of 1862, held in Dunedin, a group of gentlemen formed a committee for the promotion of a similar exhibition to be held on a larger scale in Dunedin in 1865.  An application was made in February 1863 to the Governor requesting the formation of a Royal Commission, which was granted in May.  The Provincial Government provided the sum of £4,000 for the aid of general purposes and another £4,000 to build a suitable building. John Hyde Harris was president of the executive, James Hector was commissioner and juror, Alfred Eccles the secretary and Thomas Forrester building superintendent.

Architecture

A low-level site on King Street was secured and a contract was let to Messrs. George Cornwell and Edward Horsman on November 11, 1863 for £10,250 to erect the Main Building.  There was a large two-story stone Italianate building with clock tower and a series of annexes all designed by Mason and Clayton, 
with a central courtyard derived from Fowler's design of Covent Garden market.
It was not completely finished when the fair opened.

International participation
From the America came exhibits from Canada and the United States. From Europe came exhibits from Austria, Belgium, France, Germany, Great Britain, and the Netherlands. The sole Asian exhibiting nation was that of India.  From Oceania, the colonies of New Zealand were well represented as were New South Wales, Queensland, South Australia, Tasmania, and Victoria.  Altogether there came 1,598 exhibits from about 700 exhibitors.

Legacy
Exhibits from the exhibition provided the opening collection of the colonial museum, and added to the collection at the Otago Museum, and the main building was converted into a new hospital for Dunedin.  The old annex at the rear of the building was torn down in the mid-1890s, and a fire in the tower in 1897 almost destroyed the entire building.  The old exhibition hospital finally was torn down in 1933.

After the exhibition, the collections were put into store and the art works were included in formation of Otago Society of Arts in 1876.

References

External links
 Image of the exhibition building
Official Catalogue of the New Zealand Exhibition 1865
Jurors reports from the New Zealand Exhibition 1865

1865 disestablishments in New Zealand
1865 establishments in New Zealand
Festivals in Dunedin
World's fairs in New Zealand
1860s in Dunedin
1865 in New Zealand